Safety of journalists is the ability for journalists and media professionals to receive, produce and share information without facing physical or moral threats.

Journalists can face violence and intimidation for exercising their fundamental right to freedom of expression. The range of threats they are confronted with include murder, kidnapping, hostage-taking, offline and online harassment, intimidation, enforced disappearances, arbitrary detention and torture. Women journalists also face specific dangers and are especially vulnerable to sexual assault, whether in the form of a targeted sexual violation, often in reprisal for their work; mob-related sexual violence aimed against journalists covering public events; or the sexual abuse of journalists in detention or captivity. Many of these crimes are not reported as a result of powerful cultural and professional stigmas."

Increasingly, journalists, and particularly women journalists, are facing abuse and harassment online, such as hate speech, cyber-bullying, cyber-stalking, doxing, trolling, public shaming, intimidation and threats.

Violence against journalists

Killings of journalists

From 2012 to 2016, UNESCO’s Director-General condemned the killing of 530 journalists, an average of two deaths per week. During the previous five-year period, 2007 to 2011, UNESCO recorded 316 killings. The year 2012 proved to be the deadliest year on record, with 124 journalists killed. The majority of journalists killed between 2012 and 2016 occurred in countries experiencing armed conflict, representing 56 per cent of overall killings.

According to the Committee to Protect Journalists (CPJ), nearly 50 per cent of those whose death was confirmed to be related to their work as journalist were murdered, while 36 per cent were caught in the crossfire and 14 per cent killed while on dangerous assignment.[6] According to the NGO, political groups were the most likely source of violence (36 per cent) in these killings, followed by military officials (22 per cent) and unknown sources (20 per cent).

As the reliance on freelance journalists by news organizations is increasing, a rising proportion of journalists killed have been freelance. UNESCO's study, World Trends in Freedom of Expression and Media Development Global Report 2017/2018, has found that over the past five years, 113 freelance journalists were killed, representing 21 per cent of the total. Freelance journalists are particularly vulnerable, often working alone on stories, in dangerous environments, and without the same level of assistance and protection as staff-journalists.

In the same period, according to UNESCO data, the number of journalists targeted who work primarily online fluctuated significantly, but accounts for 14 per cent of journalists killed overall. Journalists and crew who work primarily in television experienced the most casualties (166), followed by those mainly working for print (142), radio (118), online (75) and those working across multiple platforms (29).

Notable examples 

In 2018, Washington Post journalist and U.S. resident Jamal Khashoggi was ambushed, suffocated, and dismembered by agents of the Saudi government.

On May 11, 2022, Palestinian-American Al Jazeera journalist Shireen Abu Akleh was shot in the head and killed while covering a raid by the Israel Defense Forces on the Jenin refugee camp in the West Bank. Separate investigations by the Associated Press, Bellingcat, The New York Times, and the Washington Post all independently concluded that fire from an IDF unit was the most likely cause of Akleh's death. CNN suggested that Akleh's death was a targeted killing by the IDF.

Terrorism and increasing risks
Terrorism represents a direct and growing threat for journalists, which has taken the form of kidnappings, executions threats or hacking. At the end of the 1970s, the general policy of welcoming journalists into areas of guerrillas control changed. Organizations such as the Khmer Rouge in Cambodia, the Red Brigades in Italy, the Shining Path in Peru and the Armed Islamic Group (GIA) in Algeria targeted journalists, considering them as the auxiliaries of the powers they were combating, and thus as enemies. Between 1993 and 1997, more than 100 journalists and media workers were killed in Algeria. During the Lebanese Civil War (1975-1990), kidnapping international journalists became a common tactic.

According to the Committee to Protect Journalists (CPJ), 40% of the journalists murdered in 2015 were killed by groups claiming adherence to radical Islam. International press correspondents, in particular, are considered potential hostages, or sacrificial lambs, whose execution is dramatized to serve terrorist propaganda. This happened to James Foley, Steven Sotloff (United States) and Kenji Goto (Japan), who were beheaded by Daesh.

Trauma and the emotional impact of witnessing terrorism is also an issue for journalists, as they may experience anxiety, insomnia, irritation and physical problems such as fatigue or headaches. It can also lead to post-traumatic stress disorder, which can cause incapacitating feelings of horror, fear and despair. According to the study Eyewitness Media Hub of 2015, 40% of the journalists who were interviewed admitted that viewing video testimonies had had negative effects on their personal life.

The protection of sources and surveillance is one of the major issues in the coverage of terrorism in order to protect witnesses and interviewees against reprisals.

Impunity for crimes against journalists
There is a continuing trend of impunity for crimes against journalists, with over 90% of cases of killings of journalists unresolved. The Special Rapporteur for Freedom of Expression of the Inter-American Commission on Human Rights Edison Lanza considers impunity as a key obstacle to ensuring journalists' safety. Frank La Rue, UNESCO's former Assistant Director-General for Communication and Information considers that its "root cause has to be attributed to lack of political will to pursue investigations, including for fear of reprisals from criminal networks in addition to inadequate legal frameworks, a weak judicial system, lack of resources allocated to law enforcement, negligence, and corruption". 

UNESCO has set up a mechanism to monitor the status of judicial enquiries into the killings of journalists. Each year, UNESCO's Director-General sends a request to Member States in which killings of journalists have occurred asking them to inform UNESCO of the status of ongoing investigations on each killing condemned by the Organization. UNESCO records the responses to these requests in a public report submitted every two years to the International Programme for the Development of Communication (IPDC) Council by the Director-General. The IPDC's 2016 Report is summarized in the "Time to break the cycle of violence against journalists" publication which highlights key findings, provides analysis of the killings, and of Member States responses. In 2017, UNESCO sent letters to 62 Member States requesting information on the status of unresolved cases that occurred between 2006 and 2016. Based on Member State responses, the percentage of resolved cases has remained low, at less than 10%. Cumulatively, since UNESCO began requesting information on the judicial follow-up to journalists’ killings condemned by the Director-General, the Organization has received information from 63 out of 75 Member States. The information covers 622 cases out of a total of 930 recorded by UNESCO between 2006 and 2016 (67 per cent).

At its 68th session in 2013, the United Nations General Assembly adopted resolution A/RES/68/163 proclaiming 2 November as the International Day to End Impunity for Crimes Against Journalists. The day acts to promote understanding of the broader issues that accompany impunity and to strengthen international commitment to ensuring a safe and enabling environment for journalists.

The United Nations Plan of Action on the Safety of Journalists and the Issue of Impunity supports Member States in the implementation of proactive initiatives to address the prevailing culture of impunity, such as judicial capacity building and the strengthening of monitor and prosecution mechanisms.

Other attacks on the safe practice of journalism
According to data compiled by the Committee to Protect Journalists (CPJ), the imprisonment of journalists on charges relating to anti-state activities, criminal defamation, blasphemy, retaliation or on no charge at all, has continued to rise. In 2016, the CPJ reported that 259 journalists were imprisoned worldwide on a range of charges, the highest number since the non-governmental organization began keeping records in 1990.

Reporters Without Borders (RSF)—which tracks the imprisonment of citizen journalists, Netizens and media contributors, along with professional journalists—reported that 348 journalists were detained in 2016 on a range of charges, an increase of six per cent on 2015 figures. 2016 reportedly saw the proportion of women journalists detained more than double, with nearly half of those detained located in the Asia-Pacific region. The Western Europe and North America region has the highest number of journalists imprisoned, holding 34 per cent of imprisoned journalists worldwide with 73 journalists imprisoned in Turkey in 2017.

RSF Secretary-General Christophe Deloire has stated that "a full-blown hostage industry has developed in certain conflict zones", with a 35 per cent increase in 2015 compared to the previous year of the number of media hostages held worldwide.

The Media Institute of Southern Africa has documented incidents of intimidation such as the torching of vehicles, physical assault and death threats. In parts of the Arab region, journalists and prominent writers have reportedly suffered death threats, been severely beaten and had travel restrictions imposed upon them. In the Asia Pacific region, the Southeast Asian Press Alliance has noted that in some insecure contexts, physical insecurity is reportedly so tenuous that some journalists have chosen to arm themselves.

Threats and actual cases of violence and imprisonment, as well as harassment, are reported to have forced a large number of local journalists into exile each year. Between 1 June 2012 and 31 May 2015, at least 272 journalists reportedly went into exile for work-related persecution worldwide.

Self-censorship
One survey conducted by PEN America of over 520 writers found that the majority reported concerns about government surveillance, which led to a reluctance to write, research or speak about certain topics. Almost a quarter of the writers had deliberately avoided certain topics in phone and email conversations, while 16 per cent had avoided writing or speaking about a certain topic and another 11 per cent had seriously considered it. A 2017 survey conducted by the Council of Europe of 940 journalists throughout 47 member states found that in the face of physical violence or coercion, 15 per cent of journalists abandon covering sensitive, critical stories, while 31 per cent tone down their coverage and 23 per cent opt to withhold information in Europe.

Increased risks at protests 
Journalists are often responsible for covering protests. Some protests are peaceful while others become violent making coverage for journalist unsafe. In some instances the protests themselves are not violent. However, journalist remain targets. The U.S Press Freedom Tracker documents 930 reported incidents of journalists involving arrests, assault or prevention since the murder of George Floyd in 2020. In the Black Lives Matter protests alone, 400 journalists were attacked and 129 were arrested. Some attacks appear targeted not by protestors, but by law enforcement. In 2020 law enforcement was responsible for 80% of attacks on journalists. With some accounts where journalists were injured by projectiles and pepper spray.

Over the past decade there has been an increased risk for journalists covering protests. According to UNESCO's observatory of killed journalists from 2020-2021 6 journalists were killed while covering protests.  In some cases journalists are targeted based on demographics including but not limited to: their identity, race, gender, and sexual orientation.

Digital safety for journalists

Surveillance, data storage capabilities and digital attack technologies are becoming more sophisticated, less expensive and more pervasive, making journalists increasingly vulnerable to digital attacks from both state and non-state actors.

With the widespread availability of surveillance software and hardware, in a number of states across multiple regions, broadly defined legislative acts have been seen by some as working to silence digital dissent, prosecute whistle blowers and expand arbitrary surveillance across multiple digital platforms.

Cyber-harassment
In late 2016, the International Press Institute launched the OnTheLine database, a project that aims to systematically monitor online harassment of journalists as a response to their reporting. As of July 2017, the project had collected 1,065 instances of online harassment in the two countries (Turkey and Austria) in which the project collected data. In Pakistan, the Digital Rights Foundation has launched the country's first cyber harassment helpline for journalists, which aims to provide legal advice, digital security support, psychological counselling and a referral system to victims. As of May 2017, the helpline handled a total of 563 cases since its launch six months earlier, with 63 per cent of calls received from women and 37 per cent from men. Research undertaken by Pew Research Center indicated that 73 per cent of adult internet users in the United States had seen someone be harassed in some way online and 40 per cent had personally experienced it, with young women being particularly vulnerable to sexual harassment and stalking.

Gender equality and the safety of journalists

Threats on women journalists
Similar to their male counterparts, women journalists, whether they are working in an insecure context, or in a newsroom, face risks of attacks while exercising their profession but are also particularly vulnerable to attacks of a sexual nature such as, sexual harassment, sexual assault, or even rape. Such attacks can come from those attempting to silence their coverage but also from sources, colleagues and others. A 2014 global survey of nearly 1,000 women journalists, initiated by the International News Safety Institute (INSI) in partnership with the International Women's Media Foundation (IWMF) and with the support of UNESCO, found that nearly two-thirds of women who took part in the survey had experienced intimidation, threats or abuse in the workplace.

In the period from 2012 through 2016, UNESCO's Director-General denounced the killing of 38 women journalists, representing 7 per cent of all journalists killed.  The percentage of journalists killed who are women is significantly lower than their overall representation in the media workforce. In recent years the number of women killed in journalism has increased significantly. In UNESCO's report, the number of women in journalism killed nearly doubled since 2021, it jumped from 6% to 11%.  

The September 2017 report of the United Nations Secretary-General on the safety of journalists outlines a way forward for a gender-sensitive approach to strengthening the safety of women journalists. In 2016, the Council of Europe’s Committee of Ministers adopted Recommendation CM/Rec(2016)4 on the protection of journalism and safety of journalists and other media actors, in particular noting the gender-specific threats that many journalists face and calling for urgent, resolute and systematic responses. The same year, the IPDC Council requested the UNESCO Director-General's report to include gender-related information.

Online harassment of women journalists 

An analysis of more than two million tweets performed by the think tank Demos found that women journalists experienced approximately three times as many abusive comments as their male counterparts on Twitter.

The Guardian surveyed the 70 million comments recorded on its website between 1999 and 2016 (only 22,000 of which were recorded before 2006). Of these comments, approximately 1.4 million (approximately two per cent) were blocked for abusive or disruptive behavior. Of the 10 staff journalists who received the highest levels of abuse and ‘dismissive trolling’, eight were women.

The INSI and IWMF survey found that more than 25 per cent of ‘verbal, written and/or physical intimidation including threats to family and friends’ took place online.

Countering online abuse is a significant challenge, and few legislative and policy frameworks exist on the international or national level to protect journalists from digital harassment.

The International Federation of Journalists and the South Asia Media Solidarity Network launched the Byte Back campaign to raise awareness and combat online harassment of women journalists in the Asia-Pacific region.

The Organization for Security and Cooperation in Europe (OSCE) organized an expert meeting titled ‘New Challenges to Freedom of Expression: Countering Online Abuse of Female Journalists’ which produced a publication of the same title that includes the voices of journalists and academics on the realities of online abuse of women journalists and how it can be combated.

Actions taken to enhance the safety of journalists

International organizations

International instruments
International legal instruments are among the key tools that can support the creation of an enabling environment for the safety of journalists. These include the Universal Declaration of Human Rights; the Geneva Conventions; the International Covenant on Civil and Political Rights; the United Nations Commission on Human Rights Resolution 2005/81; and the United Nations Security Council Resolution 1738 (2006).

United Nations

The safety of journalists and their role in promoting inclusive and sustainable societies has been recognized by the United Nations in the 2030 Agenda for Sustainable Development. Goal 16 outlines the promotion of peaceful and inclusive societies for sustainable development, provide access to justice for all and build effective and inclusive institutions at all levels.

Since 2012, there have been a total of 12 UN resolutions on the safety of journalists adopted by several UN organs.

In December 2015, Resolution A/70/125 of the General Assembly recognized serious threats to freedom of expression in the context of reviewing progress since the 2005 World Summit on the Information Society (WSIS). The Resolution called for the protection of journalists and media workers.

The United Nations Secretary General also produces reports on the safety of journalists and the issue of impunity (in 2014 A/69/268, 2015 A/HRC/30/68 respectively, 2017 A/72/290).

SDG 16.10.1 relates to the number of verified cases of killings, kidnapping, enforced disappearance, arbitrary detention and torture of journalists, associated media personnel, trade unionists and human rights defenders. The indicator was decided upon by the United Nations Statistical Commission for tracking progress in the achievement of target 10.

The UN Plan of Action on the Safety of Journalists
The United Nations (UN) Plan of Action, coordinated by UNESCO, was elaborated to provide a comprehensive, coherent, and action-oriented UN-wide approach to the safety of journalists and the issue of impunity. Since its launch, it has become a guiding framework for activities in this area. Following its endorsement by the UN System Chief Executives Board for Coordination in 2012, the UN Plan of Action has been welcomed by the UN General Assembly, UNESCO and the Human Rights Council. Outside of the UN, it has been referred to by various regional bodies, and it has given impetus to and fostered a spirit of cooperation between the UN and various stakeholders in many countries.

UNESCO

UNESCO celebrates World Press Freedom Day every year on 3 May during which the Guillermo Cano Prize is attributed to honor the work of an individual or an organization defending or promoting freedom of expression.

UNESCO main activities on the Safety of Journalists 

 Following a request from the Office of the UN Secretary General, UNESCO coordinated with the Office of the United Nations High Commissioner for Human Rights (OHCHR) to establish a focal points system for the safety of journalists in relevant United Nations entities.
 UNESCO's work on the safety of journalists focuses on six areas: public awareness; standards creation and policy development; monitoring and reporting; capacity building; academic research; and strengthening coalitions.
 The organization is intensifying its efforts to strengthen the capacity of member states to implement, on a voluntary basis, mechanisms to prevent attacks against journalists, to protect journalists, and to prosecute the perpetrators of these attacks.
 UNESCO also focuses on activities to raise awareness and train representatives of the judiciary, law enforcement agencies and parliaments on the importance of freedom of the press and the safety of journalists.
 UNESCO is also placing increased emphasis on tackling the specific threats faced by women journalists, both online and offline.

UNESCO's Journalists Safety Indicators
UNESCO's IPDC developed the Journalists Safety Indicators (JSI) to "pinpoint significant matters that show, or impact upon, the safety of journalists and the issue of impunity". These indicators map the key features that can help assess safety of journalists, and determine whether adequate follow-up is given to crimes committed against them. Analysis based on the Journalists Safety indicators have been conducted in Guatemala (2013), Kenya (2016), Nepal (2016), Pakistan (2013–2014).

The Organization for Security and Co-operation in Europe
The OSCE Representative on Freedom of the Media performs an early warning function and provides rapid response to serious noncompliance with regard to free media and free expression. The Representative maintains direct contacts with authorities, media and civil society representatives and other parties and shares his/ her observations and recommendations with the OSCE participating States twice a year.

Regional organizations

The Council of Europe
In May 2014, the Council of the European Union adopted the European Union Human Rights Guidelines on Freedom of Expression Online and Offline, which stated that the European Union would ‘take all appropriate steps to ensure the protection of journalists, both in terms of preventive measures and by urging effective investigations when violations occur’. In April 2014, the Council of Europe's Committee of Ministers adopted a resolution on the protection of journalism and safety of journalists and other media actors, which called for concerted international efforts and led to the creation of an online platform for monitoring infringements of freedom of expression.

The Organization of American States
The Organization of American States (OAS) has played a proactive role in promoting the safety of journalists. In June 2017, the General Assembly of the OAS passed Resolution R86/17, which urged States ‘to implement comprehensive measures for prevention, protection, investigation and punishment of those responsible, as well as to put into action strategies to end impunity for crimes against journalists and share good practices'.

The Commonwealth
The Secretary-General of the Commonwealth has pledged support for the United Nations Plan of Action, working to promote journalist safety and institutional mechanisms that foster freedom of expression within member states across different regions.

Academia, civil society and media
The Centre for Freedom of the Media at the University of Sheffield launched the Journalists’ Safety Research Network (JSRN). The JSRN contributes to advancing academic cooperation on the safety of journalists by increasing research capacity, collaboration and knowledge sharing within the academic community.

In 2014, Columbia University, United States, established Columbia Global Freedom of Expression, which brings together international experts and activists with the university's faculty and students, in order to ‘survey, document and strengthen free expression’.

In 2015, the International Press Institute, Al Jazeera Media Network, Geneva Global Media and the Geneva Press Club presented the International Declaration and Best Practices on the Promotion of Journalists Safety. The declaration aims to reinforce and promote existing international obligations and mechanisms associated with the safety of journalists and contribute to the protection of their rights.

The same year, news media organizations joined forces with press freedom NGOs and journalists to launch the A Culture of Safety (ACOS) Alliance. The ACOS Alliance's Freelance Journalist Safety Principles, a set of practices for newsrooms and journalists on dangerous assignments, have been endorsed by 90 organizations around the world. In addition, a network of safety officers in media companies expanded following the meeting ‘Media Organizations Standing Up for the Safety of Journalists’ held at UNESCO in February 2016.

Reporters without Borders (RSF) is an international non-governmental organization recognized as being of public utility in France. It aims to defend press freedom and the protection of journalism sources. It is mainly known for its annual ranking on the status of press freedom worldwide and monitoring of the crimes committed against journalists.

The Committee to Protect Journalists (CPJ) is a non-governmental organization that aims to "defend the right of journalists to report the news without fear of reprisal" and promote freedom of expression. The NGO monitors the imprisonment, disappearances and killings of journalists worldwide. The Organization informs on the status of freedom of the press and journalists safety in conflict countries and others, and helps journalists through services such as the emergencies response teams, the safety advisories and the security guide. CPJ's annual International Press Freedom Awards recognizes bravery for journalists from all around the world.

Sources

References

Freedom of expression
Journalism
Censorship
Human rights